Brachmia dryotyphla is a moth in the family Gelechiidae. It was described by Edward Meyrick in 1937. It is found in Mumbai, India.

References

Moths described in 1937
Brachmia
Taxa named by Edward Meyrick
Moths of Asia